Yarmouth was a borough constituency of the House of Commons of England then of the House of Commons of Great Britain from 1707 to 1800 and of the House of Commons of the United Kingdom from 1801 to 1832. It was represented by two members of parliament (MPs), elected by the bloc vote system.

The constituency was abolished by the Reform Act 1832, and from the 1832 general election its territory was included in the new county constituency of Isle of Wight.

Boundaries
The constituency was a Parliamentary borough on the Isle of Wight, part of the historic county of Hampshire. Its boundaries were coterminous with the parish of Yarmouth. At the time that it was disfranchised, there were 114 houses in the borough and town, and a population of only 586.

History

The borough was seen as a rotten borough and in the late eighteenth century was managed, together with the other Isle of Wight boroughs of Newtown and Newport by Thomas Holmes.

Members of Parliament

MPs 1584–1640

MPs 1640–1832 

Notes

Elections

See also
Politics of the Isle of Wight
Parliamentary representation from Isle of Wight
Great Yarmouth (UK Parliament constituency) in Norfolk

References
 Robert Beatson, A Chronological Register of Both Houses of Parliament (London: Longman, Hurst, Res & Orme, 1807) 
 D Brunton & D H Pennington, Members of the Long Parliament (London: George Allen & Unwin, 1954)
Cobbett's Parliamentary history of England, from the Norman Conquest in 1066 to the year 1803 (London: Thomas Hansard, 1808) 
 J Holladay Philbin, Parliamentary Representation 1832 – England and Wales (New Haven: Yale University Press, 1965)
 Henry Stooks Smith, The Parliaments of England from 1715 to 1847 (2nd edition, edited by FWS Craig – Chichester: Parliamentary Reference Publications, 1973)
 

History of the Isle of Wight
Parliamentary constituencies in South East England (historic)
Constituencies of the Parliament of the United Kingdom established in 1584
Constituencies of the Parliament of the United Kingdom disestablished in 1832
Rotten boroughs
Politics of the Isle of Wight
Yarmouth, Isle of Wight